Navaratnas  (Sanskrit dvigu nava-ratna) or Nauratan was a term applied to a group of nine extraordinary people in an emperor's court in India. The well-known Nauratnas include the ones in the courts of the  Hindu emperor Vikramaditya, the Mughal emperor Akbar, and the feudal lord Raja Krishnachandra.

Vikramaditya's Navaratnas 

Vikramaditya was a legendary emperor, who ruled from Ujjain. According to folk tradition, his court had 9 famous scholars.

The earliest source that mentions this legend is Jyotirvid-abharana (22.10), a treatise attributed to Kalidasa. According to this text, the following 9 scholars (including Kalidasa himself) attended Vikramaditya's court:

Another popular tradition mentions the astronomer Brahmagupta and the magician Vaitalik instead of Ghatkharpar and Vetala-Bhatta.

However, Jyotirvid-abharana is a literary forgery of a date later than Kalidasa, and was probably attributed to Kalidasa to popularize it. V. V. Mirashi dates the work to 12th century, and points out that it could not have been composed by Kalidasa, because it contains grammatical faults. Other scholars have variously dated the text to the 13th century (Sudhakara Dvivedi), 16th century (A.B. Keith), and 18th century (H. Kern).

There is no mention of such "Navaratnas" in earlier literature. D. C. Sircar calls this tradition "absolutely worthless for historical purposes".

There is no historical evidence to show that these nine scholars were contemporary figures or proteges of the same king. Vararuchi is believed to have lived around 3rd or 4th century CE. The period of Kalidasa is debated, but most historians place him around 5th century CE. Varahamihira is known to have lived in 6th century CE. Dhanavantari was the author of a medical glossary (Nighantu); his period is uncertain. Amarasimha cannot be dated with certainty either, but his lexicon utilizes the works of Dhanavantari and Kalidasa; therefore, he cannot be dated to 1st century BCE, when the legendary Vikramaditya is said to have established the Vikrama Samvat in 57 BCE. Not much is known about Shanku, Vetalabhatta, Kshapanaka and Ghatakarpara. Some Jain writers identify Siddhasena Divakara as Kshapanaka, but this claim is not accepted by historians.

Kalidasa is the only figure whose association with Vikramaditya is mentioned in works earlier than Jyotirvidabharana. Rajasekhara's Kāvyamimāṃsa (10th century), Bhoja's Sringara Prakasa (11th century) and Kshemendra's Auchitya-Vichara-Charcha (11th century) mention that Vikramaditya sent Kalidasa as his ambassador to the Kuntala country (identified with present-day Uttara Kannada). The historicity of these legends is doubtful.

Akbar's Navaratnas

According to popular tradition, the court of the Mughal ruler Akbar had nine intellectuals called the Navaratnas or the nine gems. As in Vikramaditya's case, this tradition has no historical basis. According to historian G.S. Sardesai, Hindu pandits in the court of Shah Jahan or Dara Shikoh - Jagannathrai or Kavindracharya - may have started this tradition.

Since this tradition is historically inaccurate, the names of the nine gems varies between sources. Some of the names included in various lists include:

For example, a painting kept at the Lala Sri Ramdas Library (Delhi) in the 1940s depicts the following people as the nine gems: Abdul Rahim, Todar Mal, Man Singh, Birbal, Miyan Kokultash, Hakim Humam, Abul Hasan, Abu'l-Fazl, and Faizi.

Raja Krishnachandra's Nabaratnas

Raja Krishnachandra was a ruler of Bengal, who ruled over 1727 to 1772. According to legend, his court had 9 famous scholars, who are mentioned as ‘Nabaratnas’ (নবরত্ন). These included Gopal Bhar, Bharatchandra Raygunakor, Ramprasad Sen, Baneshwar Bidyalankar, Krishnananda Bachaspati, Rammohan Goswami, Madhusudan Nyayalankar, Jagannath Tarkapanchanan and  Hariram Tarkasiddhanta.

Similar groups
Many famous emperors in India had courtiers labeled in similar ways. For example, the valuable members of the court of Krishna Deva Raya were termed Astadiggajas, the eight scholars. Lakshmana Sena the ruler of the Sena Empire had Pancharatnas (meaning 5 gems who were Govardhana, Sarana, Jayadeva(author of Gita govinda), umapati, Dhoyi in his court. Ashtapradhan mandal was the title given to the council of Shivaji.

References

Mughal Court
Indian royalty